is a Japanese former professional footballer who played as a defender. He played for Japan national team.

Club career
Morioka was born in Yokohama on 7 October 1975. After graduating from high school, he joined Kashima Antlers in 1994. He moved to Shimizu S-Pulse in August 1995. He played many matches as center back. The club won 1996 J.League Cup and 2001 J1 League. In Asia, the club won the champions 1999–2000 Asian Cup Winners' Cup and te 3rd place 2000–01 Asian Cup Winners' Cup. However his opportunity to play decreased from 2005. He moved to J2 League club Kyoto Sanga FC in 2007. He played as captain and the club was promoted to J1 League in 2007. He retired end of 2008 season.

International career
In April 1995, Morioka was selected Japan U-20 national team for 1995 World Youth Championship, but he did not play in the match.

On 31 March 1999, Morioka debuted for Japan national team against Brazil. After the debut, he became a regular player and played all matches including 1999 Copa America in 1999. He mainly played as central defender in three back as Masami Ihara successor. He also served as captain in many matches. In September 2000, he was elected Japan U-23 national team as over age for 2000 Summer Olympics. He played 3 games as captain. In October, he played at 2000 Asian Cup. He played full-time in all 6 matches and Japan won the champions. He also played at 2001 Confederations Cup and Japan won the 2nd place. In 2002, he could not play for injury. He was elected Japan for 2002 World Cup. He played as captain in first match against Belgium, but he was injured and replaced. After 2002 World Cup, in March 2003, he was elected Japan again by new manager Zico. On 8 June 2003, the match against Argentina is his last game for Japan. Although he was a member of Japan for 2003 Confederations Cup in June, he did not play in the match. He played 38 games for Japan until 2003.

Coaching career
After retirement, Morioka started coaching career at Kyoto Sanga FC in 2009. He served as coach for top team and manager for youth team until 2016 excluding 2014 he moved to Sagawa Printing Kyoto and served as coach. In 2017, he moved to J3 League club Gainare Tottori and became a manager. However Gainare results were bad and finished at the bottom place of 17 clubs. He was sacked in June 2018 when the club was at the 7th place.

Career statistics

Club

International

Managerial statistics

Honors
Japan
 FIFA Confederations Cup runner-up: 2001
 AFC Asian Cup: 2000

Individual
 J1 League Best Eleven: 1999
 AFC Asian Cup Best Defender: 2000
 Selected to AFC All Star Team: 2000

References

External links
 
 
 Japan National Football Team Database
 
 

1975 births
Living people
Association football people from Kanagawa Prefecture
Japanese footballers
Japan international footballers
J1 League players
J2 League players
Kashima Antlers players
Shimizu S-Pulse players
Kyoto Sanga FC players
Japanese football managers
J3 League managers
Gainare Tottori managers
Olympic footballers of Japan
1999 Copa América players
Footballers at the 2000 Summer Olympics
2000 AFC Asian Cup players
2001 FIFA Confederations Cup players
2002 FIFA World Cup players
2003 FIFA Confederations Cup players
AFC Asian Cup-winning players
Association football defenders